The Wilawila are an indigenous Australian tribe of the Kimberley region of Western Australia.

Name
Norman Tindale gave "wilawila" as the proper tribal ethnonym, but noted that, according to reports by the missionary Theodore Hernández, the same group appeared to bear an alternative ethnonym, namely "Taib", which Tindale took to be a Wilawila horde.

Country

Social organization
The Wilawila were divided into tribal subgroupings or clans/hordes, of which the following names survive.
 Taib (Carson river)
 Munumbara (Headwaters of the Forrest River)
 Kalari (Middle Drysdale River)
 Andedja (Southern tributaries of upper Forrest River)
 Piarngongo (Mount Beatrice)

Tindale also speaks of a Wilawila group, the Tjawurungari/Tawandjangango, on the Osborne Islands, speaking a lighter dialect of the language spoken by the Kambure.

Alternative names

 Andedja
 Andidja, Andadja
 Kalari
 Karunjie
 ? Kundjanan, Kandjanan
 Munumbara
 Munumburu
 Piarngongo
  Taib
 Taibange (Taib member)
 ? Ullumbuloo
 Wular (language name)
 Wulu

Source:

Notes

Citations

Sources

Aboriginal peoples of Western Australia